Pogiblovo is a rural locality (a village) in Yurovskoye Rural Settlement, Gryazovetsky District, Vologda Oblast, Russia. The population was 4 as of 2002.

Geography 
Pogiblovo is located 18 km west of Gryazovets (the district's administrative centre) by road. Dyakovo is the nearest rural locality.

References 

Rural localities in Gryazovetsky District